This page lists the locations in the DC Universe, the shared universe setting of DC Comics.

Sites

 the Arrowcave – The former base of operations of the Green Arrow and Speedy.
 Avernus Cemetery – A burial ground in Central City for the enemies of the Flash known as the Rogues; it is in a hidden location.
 the Batcave – The headquarters of Batman. Located directly beneath Wayne Manor.
 Burnside – A borough of Gotham City that is connected to Gotham by the Burnside Bridge. Burnside Heights is the trendy neighborhood in Burnside where The New 52 version of Batgirl (Barbara Gordon) lives.   
 the Casanova Club – A nightclub owned by Alex Logue in Newcastle, England. It was there that a demon was summoned and John Constantine failed to save a young girl who was taken to Hell. 
 Crime Alley – The most dangerous area of Gotham City, where Thomas and Martha Wayne were killed by Joe Chill during a mugging.
 the Daily Planet Building – The home office of the Daily Planet, Metropolis' main newspaper.
 Danny the Street – A sentient street and a member of the Doom Patrol.
 the Flash Museum – A memorial to the Flash (Barry Allen). Located in Central City.
 the Fortress of Solitude – An Arctic fortress used by Superman as a secret base. Located near the North Pole.
 the Hall of Doom – The home base of the Legion of Doom.
 the Hall of Justice – The one-time home base of the Justice League. A version of this is the headquarters of the Justice League in the animated series Super Friends. Another version of this appears in both Justice League Unlimited, and Young Justice, where the Hall appears as the headquarters of the Justice League to the public eye.
 the House of Mystery – The extradimensional structure presided over by Cain.
 the House of Secrets – The extradimensional structure presided over by Abel. A version of this is also the headquarters of the Secret Six.
 the Reichuss Mansion – A mobile haunted house that served as the House of Secrets in the 1990s Vertigo series of that name.
 the Iceberg Lounge – A nightclub and base of operations for the Penguin. Located in Gotham City. The club is featured in Gotham, The Lego Batman Movie, and The Batman. 
 Justice Society Headquarters – Current version built on the foundation of the former brownstone headquarters and museum. The former headquarters in Gotham City, the latter in Manhattan. Sometimes called Dodds Mansion.
 the LexCorp Towers complex – The former headquarters of Lex Luthor. Located in Metropolis.
 Lux – The bar/nightclub based in Los Angeles owned by Lucifer Morningstar and his mistress Mazikeen.
 the Netherworld – A fictional area of the city of Chicago.
 the Oblivion Bar – An extradimensional bar used as a gathering place/hangout for magic users, as well as the headquarters for the Shadowpact.
 Project Cadmus – An experimental genetics lab. Located in Metropolis. The Young Justice animated series has it located in Washington, D.C.
 the Sanctum of Doctor Fate – Located in Salem, Massachusetts.
 the Secret Sanctuary – The original headquarters of the Justice League of America and briefly headquarters of the Doom Patrol. Located in Happy Harbor, Rhode Island.
 Sherwood Florist – Originally in Seattle and now in Star City, the business operated by Black Canary.
 Suicide Slum – A dangerous part of Metropolis.
 Titans Tower – The headquarters of the Teen Titans, originally located in New York City. Currently located in San Francisco.
 the Underworld – A place in Metropolis's sewers which is rejected by society and where the Warworlders took control.
 Valhalla Cemetery – A burial ground located in Metropolis for superheroes who have died in the line of duty; it is meant to be a sacred resting place for superheroes.
 Wayne Manor – The ancestral home of Bruce Wayne. Located outside Gotham City.
 Wayne Tower – The location of the main offices of Wayne Enterprises. It is located in downtown Gotham City.

Correctional facilities
 Arkham Asylum – An asylum used to house criminally insane convicts in Gotham City. 
 Belle Reve – A high security metahuman prison located in St. Roch, Louisiana and the headquarters of the Suicide Squad. In Smallville, Belle Reve Sanitarium is a prison for "meteor freaks" (metahumans), and the mentally ill located near Kansas. Belle Reve Special Security Barracks appears in the DC Extended Universe, as the location where Lex Luthor was sent at the end of Batman v Superman: Dawn of Justice  and in Suicide Squad where it is revealed to be a Black Site where the Suicide Squad is recruited. In The Suicide Squad the location has been renamed Belle Reve Correctional Center (and is also referred to in some paperwork as Belle Reve Penitentiary), and is implied to be under the authority of both A.R.G.U.S and US Department of Corrections (a fictional version of the US Bureau of Prisons). 
 Blackgate Penitentiary – Located near Gotham City and also called Blackgate Prison, it is a prison known to house mostly non-metahuman criminals in Gotham City. A version of Blackgate prison appears in The Dark Knight Rises as the new home for criminals but was broken into by the terrorist Bane and his army. It also appears in several episodes of Gotham.
 Gotham State Penitentiary – A prison located in the Sommerset neighborhood, which is 12 miles from Arkham Asylum. It appears in several episodes of Batman.
 Iron Heights Penitentiary – A high security prison devised for many of the foes of either version of the Flash. Located near Keystone City.
 Peña Duro – Also called Hard Rock in English, it is the former prison of the villain Bane that is located in Santa Prisca.
 Rock Falls Penitentiary – A prison in Rock Falls, Iowa where Dr. Sivana is imprisoned in after the events of Shazam!.
 Ravenscar Secure Facility – A mental asylum in Yorkshire that John Constantine was committed to after the Newcastle Incident.
 Slabside Island – Also called the Slab and Slabside Penitentiary, it is a high security metahuman prison. Originally in New Jersey, it was later transported to Antarctica after what happened in the Joker's "Last Laugh" riot. Shilo Norman was the original warden of Slabside Penitentiary. A version of it appears in Arrow called Slabside Maximum Security Prison where Oliver Queen is sent to for crimes as the Green Arrow.
 Stonegate Penitentiary – A penitentiary in Gotham City, prominently featured in DC Animated Universe shows.
 Stryker's Island – A prominent penitentiary in Metropolis, featured in DC Animated Universe shows like Superman: The Animated Series and Justice League Unlimited. It is also featured in Lego DC Super Villains as a main hub and in the climax in Batman V Superman: Dawn of Justice as an abandoned island between Gotham City and Metropolis.

Industrial sites

 Ace Chemicals – A chemical plant in Gotham City where the Joker supposedly originated. Ace Chemicals is present in several films and TV shows – Batman: The Animated Series, Batman (1989; renamed as Axis Chemicals), Suicide Squad, The Flash episode "Back to Normal", Birds of Prey etc.
 AmerTek Industries – A military arms dealer previously in Washington, D.C. John Henry Irons worked there until he discovered his inventions were being used for evil purposes. The company appears in a Season 5 episode of Arrow and alluded to via Deadshot in Batman: Arkham Origins and continuing in Batman: Arkham Knight.
 Big Belly Burger – A popular fast food restaurant chain.
 Daggett Industries – A pharmaceutical company founded and owned by Roland Daggett. It appears in Batman: The Animated Series and The Dark Knight Rises, via John Daggett.
 Ferris Aircraft – Coast City aerospace company originally founded and owned by Carl Ferris and Conrad Bloch  and now run by his daughter, Carol Ferris. It appears in other media like Justice League: The New Frontier, Green Lantern, Green Lantern: First Flight and mentioned in the Arrowverse.
 GothCorp – A company based in Gotham City, founded and owned by Ferris Boyle, targeted by ex-employee Victor Fries. The company is seen in Batman: The Animated Series and in Arkham Origins.
 Ironworks – Located in Metropolis, founded and owned by John Henry Irons. 
 Kord Industries – An industrial firm founded and owned by Ted Kord. Kord Industries is mentioned in several episodes of Arrow and seen in Smallville episode "Booster".
 LexCorp – An international multi-corporation founded and owned by Lex Luthor.
 Lord Technologies – Founded and owned by Maxwell Lord in the Arrowverse. In Wonder Woman 1984, Black Gold Cooperative, also known as simply Black Gold, was an oil cooperative founded by Max Lord during the Cold War.
 Rathaway Industries – Founded by Osgood Rathaway, father of the Pied Piper.
 Queen Industries – An international corporation founded and owned by Robert and Moira Queen and later run by their son, Oliver Queen.
 Stagg Enterprises – A research and development firm in genetics research founded by Simon Stagg.
 S.T.A.R. Labs – Laboratories for scientific research on metahuman studies located in various facilities.
 Wayne Enterprises – An international multi corporation owned by Bruce Wayne.

Extraterrestrial sites
 Hardcore Station – A lawless space-city run by corporations.
 the Justice League Satellite – The headquarters of the Justice League of America. It is located in orbit 22,300 miles above the surface of the Earth. It is destroyed during the Crisis on Infinite Earths.
 the Justice League Watchtower – Originally a White Martian base located on the Moon, it is later used as the headquarters of the JLA. 
 Portworld – An intergalactic spaceport and home of Green Lanterns Wyxla and Tahr.
 Starlag – A prison station used by the Alien Alliance. First appeared in Invasion! #1 (January 1989).
 Ranx the Sentient City – A sentient city and member of the Sinestro Corps.  It was first mentioned in the story "Tygers", in Tales of the Green Lantern Corps Annual #2 (1986). It was destroyed by Green Lantern Sodam Yat.
 Warworld – An artificial planet used by Mongul and Brainiac.

Schools and universities
 Burnside College – The private college that Batgirl (Barbara Gordon) attends in the New 52 universe.
 Gotham Academy – As of DC Rebirth continuity, it is a prestigious private boarding school that many of Gotham City's elite have attended. Previous incarnations of institutes with the name "Gotham Academy" includes The Batman and Young Justice television series, where it was the school of Dick Grayson, Artemis Crock, Barbara Gordon, and others.
 Gotham Military Academy – A military academy located in Gotham City. Colonel Sophie Moore, a former classmate and girlfriend of Kate Kane when the two attended West Point, is an instructor there.
 Gotham University – Also called Gotham State University, it is located in Gotham City. In the Golden Age story "The Man Behind the Red Hood!", Batman and Robin, while teaching a criminology class, discovered that the Joker was the criminal formerly known as the Red Hood. Other staff and students include Dr. Jonathan Crane and Stephanie Brown.
 Holliday College – The main university in Gateway City. Wonder Woman met the Beeta Lambda sorority members the Holliday Girls and Etta Candy there.
 Hudson University – A university located in New Carthage, New York. Notable former students and staff include Dick Grayson, Professor Martin Stein and Duela Dent. It was first mentioned in Batman comics in the late 1940s. Hudson University has also appeared in the Law & Order franchise and other TV series.
 Ivy University – Located in Ivy Town. The Atom (Ray Palmer) used to work in the physics department. 
 Legion Academy – A training school for the Legion of Super Heroes. Located in Metropolis in the 31st century.
 Metropolis University – The main university in Metropolis. Clark Kent is an alumnus of MU.
 Midwestern University – Located in Keystone City, this university is the alma mater of Jay Garrick. In some stories, the school is called Western State University.
 Sanford Military Academy - An international boarding school with a reputation as a "dumping ground" for problem children from wealthy families.
 Stanhope College – A college located just outside Metropolis. Linda Lee, the Silver Age Supergirl, was a former student.  Post-Crisis, the school, now located in Leesburg, Virginia, is renamed Stanhope University; Linda Danvers is enrolled here.
 Université Notre Dame des Ombres (Our Lady of the Shadows University) – A college in France specifically for the training of spies and super-enhanced humans. The headmistress is the former Phantom Lady Sandra Knight. Graduates include the future Phantom Lady Dee Tyler, and Vivian and Constance D'Aramis.

Sites that exist exclusively in other DC media
 Stonegate Prison – A prison that is analogous to Blackgate Prison in Batman: The Animated Series and the greater DC Animated Universe.

Cities of the DC Universe Earth

Fictional cities
 Amnesty Bay – The surface-home of Aquaman and his father, Thomas Curry.  Located in Maine, but relocated in Massachusetts during The New 52.
 Baralsville – A small mining town that is visited by Clark Kent. Located in northern Pennsylvania.
 Blüdhaven – The former home of Dick Grayson (Nightwing) of the Post-Crisis continuity that was destroyed by the Secret Society of Super Villains, who dropped Chemo on it during Infinite Crisis. In the New 52 universe, during the DC Rebirth event, the Dick Grayson of that continuity later settled in his reality's version after the Pre-Flashpoint Superman told him the story about his alternate universe counterpart. Located near Gotham City in southern New Jersey. Mentioned various times in The Lego Batman Movie as the southerly twin city of Gotham City. The city was also mentioned in Birds of Prey, Arrow, The Flash, Batwoman and The Batman. 
 Blue Valley – The birthplace of the third Flash (Wally West) and home of Stargirl. Located in Nebraska.
 Calvin City – The home of the Golden Age Atom. Located in Pennsylvania.
 Central City – The former home of the second Flash (Barry Allen). Its location has been variously stated to be in Ohio, Illinois, and Florida. During the Wally West era, it was shown to be in Missouri, across a river from Keystone City.
 Charlton's Point – The home of Miguel Devante, the new Son of Vulcan.
 Civic City – The former home of the Justice Society of America. Located in Pennsylvania.
 Coast City – The home of Green Lantern Hal Jordan. The city is destroyed by Mongul and the Cyborg Superman during the "Reign of the Supermen!" storyline. It is later restored by the actions of the Spectre and Hal Jordan. Located in California.
 Codsville – A small fishing village in Maine for which the original Doom Patrol gave their lives. Renamed "Four Heroes City" after the death of the team.
 Cosmos – The hometown of the Teen Titan Risk. Located in Colorado.
 Crucible – A city briefly visited by the Resurrection Man. Located in Georgia, on Interstate 285.
 Dakota City – The home of Icon, Static, the Shadow Cabinet and the Blood Syndicate.
 Delta City – The home of the Heckler and Vext. It is established in Vext #1 that it exists within regular DCU continuity.
 Dos Rios – The home of the second El Diablo. Located in Texas.
 Elmond – The home of the Hawk and the Dove. Located in Oregon.
 Empire City – The home of the second Manhunter, Paul Kirk. Located somewhere in the East Coast of the United States.
 Evergreen City – The former home of Green Lantern Hal Jordan. Located in Washington.
 Fairfax – A New England town that is home to Chris King and Vicki Grant.
 Fairfield – The former home of Billy Batson (Captain Marvel), Mary Batson (Mary Marvel), and their adopted parents. Destroyed by Mister Atom.
 Fawcett City – The home of Captain Marvel, the Marvel Family, Bulletman and Bulletgirl, Ibis the Invincible, and several other characters formerly associated with Fawcett Comics. Located in the Midwest, but in the Shazam! movie, set in Philadelphia.
 Feithera – A hidden city of bird-people. The home of Northwind. Located in Greenland (destroyed).
 Freeland - Originally depicted as a neighborhood in the city of Metropolis. Reinvented for the Black Lightning TV show as a large city in Georgia. Home to Black Lightning and filled with metas (people with powers).
 Gateway City – The former home of Wonder Woman, the first Mister Terrific, and the Spectre. Located in California.
 Gorilla City – A hidden city populated by super-intelligent gorillas, and even chimpanzees; reminiscent of Mangani from Tarzan, and even Planet of the Apes. Home of Detective Chimp, Solovar, Gorilla Grodd, Monsieur Mallah, Titano, and Giganta. Located in Equatorial Africa.
 Gotham City – The home of Batman. Former home of Alan Scott. Located in New Jersey across the Delaware Bay.
 Happy Harbor – The location of the Secret Sanctuary of the JLA, and former home of Lucas "Snapper" Carr and the Red Tornado. Located in Rhode Island. 
 Hatton Corners – A small town saved from Mister Twister by the Teen Titans in their first appearance.
 The Hidden City – The home of the magically gifted Homo magi people, including Zatara and Zatanna. Located in Turkey.
 Hope Springs – A small mining town which was once part of the Mosaic World. Visited by Hal Jordan and Green Arrow when it was called Desolation. Located in West Virginia.
 Hub City – The home of the Question and the first Blue Beetle, Dan Garrett.
 Ivy Town – The home of the second and current Atom. Located in Massachusetts. The city appears in the Arrowverse shows Arrow, Legends of Tomorrow and The Flash and is mentioned in a Season 3 episode of Supergirl.
 Jump City – The place of origin and first camp of the founding members of the Teen Titans.
 Keystone City – The home of both the first and third Flashes: Jay Garrick and Wally West, as well as Jakeem Thunder. In Post-Crisis stories, it is located across a river from Central City, located in Kansas. The city appears in several episodes of The Flash.
 Liberty Hill – The hometown of the third Tattooed Man. Located in the Washington metropolitan area.
 Littleville – The home of Robby Reed. Located in Colorado.
 Mapleville – A small town Superman visited in Action Comics #179.
 Metropolis – The home of Superman. Metropolis is speculated to be located in the city of Cleveland, Ohio or in a region of New York/New Jersey, although the vast majority of sources within DC have placed Metropolis in Delaware, on the opposite side of the Delaware Bay from Gotham City in New Jersey (in the "Bronze Age" continuity, these two cities were considered "twin cities" and were connected by the "Metro-Narrows Bridge", stated to be the longest suspension bridge on Earth-One).
 Middleton – The former home of the Martian Manhunter. Located in Colorado, just north of Denver.
 Midway City – The former home of Hawkman and Hawkwoman and the Doom Patrol. Located in Michigan, previously in Illinois. The town appears in Suicide Squad, is mentioned several times and appeared in a season 6 episode of The Flash, "License to Elongate".
 Midwest City – The former home of Captain Comet (Pre-Crisis only).
 Midvale – The home of the Pre-Crisis Supergirl.
 Monument Point – The home to the Justice Society of America as they try to rebuild the city after they failed to save it from destruction.
 Nanda Parbat – The mystical city hidden in the mountains of Tibet; mostly associated with the hero Deadman. Depicted as the home of the League of Assassins in the TV series Arrow.
 National City – The home of Supergirl. Originally created for her TV series of the same name, but was later adapted into the comics, and then used as Supergirl's home starting from DC Rebirth. Located in Southern California. Coincidentally, there is a real-life National City, California.
 New Carthage – The location of Hudson University where Dick Grayson (among others) attended college. Located in New York.
 New Venice – A partially submerged city used as Aquaman's base of operations for a time. Located in Florida.
 Opal City – The home of Starman.
 Park City – The former home of the second Black Canary on Earth-Two.
 Platinum Flats – The home of the Birds of Prey beginning in 2008. Located in California.
 Port Oswego – The home of Naomi, located in Oregon.
 Portsmouth – The home of the second Doctor Mid-Nite. Located in Washington.
 Radiance – The home of the 1940s hero Little Boy Blue. Located in Pennsylvania.
 River City – The home of the Odd Man.
 Santa Marta – This city served the Flash briefly as a base of operations. It was all but destroyed by Major Disaster. Located in California.
 Science City – The home of the Titan Red Star. Located in Russia.
 Smallville – The former home of Clark Kent and Conner Kent. Located in Kansas.
 Solar City, Florida – The home of Bruce Gordon/Eclipso.
 Star City – The home of the Green Arrow. Location has varied over the years; however, the DC Rebirth Green Arrow series specifically states it was originally Seattle, only later being renamed Star City.
 Sub Diego – A submerged part of San Diego located off the coast of California. It is the home of Aquagirl and served as a base of operations for Aquaman for a time.
 Superbia – The home base of the Ultramarine Corps. Floated over the radioactive remains of Montevideo, later floated and smashed into Kinshasa.
 Tinasha – Located in the Democratic Republic of Congo, it is the base of operations for David Zavimbe, the first Batwing.
 Vanity – The home of Aztek. Located in Oregon.
 Viceroy – The home of the Resurrection Man. Located in South Carolina.
 Violet Valley – The home of the Rachel Pollack version of the Doom Patrol.
 Zenith City – A city located near Robby Reed's home in Littleville.

Actual cities that also exist on the DC Universe Earth
 Baltimore – The hometown of Guy Gardner.
 Boston, Massachusetts – The former home base of Wonder Woman and the occasional residence of Aquaman and his wife, Mera.
 Chicago – The base of operations of Supergirl, Hawkman and Hawkwoman, Ted Kord, the second Blue Beetle, Nightwing, Duela Dent, Batman
 Dallas, Texas – The hometown of the third Air Wave.
 Dayton – The hometown of Black Alice.
 Denver – The former home base of the Martian Manhunter.
 Detroit – The hometown of Cyborg, John Stewart, Simon Baz, Lady Shiva, and the former home base of a Justice League branch, Firestorm and Vixen.
 El Paso – The hometown of Jaime Reyes, the third Blue Beetle.
 Gary, Indiana - The hometown of Erik Storn, the third Fury.
 Hoboken, NJ - The hometown of Carlo Sirianni and "Matches" Malone.
 Honolulu, Hawaii - The home base of Superboy in his 1990's series.
 Houma, Louisiana – The home of the Swamp Thing.
 Kansas City, Missouri – The home to the Doom Patrol during the Kupperberg/Morrison run.
 London, England – The current home base of Wonder Woman and the occasional residence of John Constantine the Hellblazer.
 Los Angeles – The hometown of Kyle Rayner and the former home base of the heroine Manhunter (Kate Spencer), the Outsiders and Blue Devil.
 Manchester, Alabama – The adopted hometown of Bart Allen/Kid Flash.
 Metropolis, Illinois – It celebrates Superman the fictional character and exists in the DC Universe as celebrating the real Superman.
 Milwaukee, Wisconsin – The hometown of Obsidian.
 New York City – The home base to many superheroes over the years, including the current incarnation of the Teen Titans. Nicknamed "the Cinderella City" in the DC Universe.
 Philadelphia – The hometown of the second Ray and the original Black Condor.
 Phoenix, Arizona – The hometown of Starman Will Payton.
 Pittsburgh – The hometown for several years of the original Firestorm.
 San Diego – Half of this city was submerged under the ocean due to an earthquake, becoming Sub Diego. The outlying suburbs are the home of Animal Man.
 San Francisco – The former home base of the Teen Titans, Superboy, Supergirl, the Secret Society of Super Villains, the Power Company, and Zatanna.
 Seattle – The current home base of the Green Arrow and his company, Q-Core and the former home city of the Black Canary, where she owned and operated Sherwood Florist, a flower shop.
 St. Louis – The hometown of Skyrocket.
 St. Roch – The New Orleans neighborhood where the Modern Age Hawkman and Hawkgirl live.
 Topeka, Kansas – It was destroyed by an explosion during an alien invasion, but was later restored.
 Tokyo, Japan – The home base for the Super Young Team and Big Science Action.
 Washington, D.C. – The current home base of Steel, the Alpha Centurion and the Freedom Fighters.
 Waverly, Pennsylvania – The home base of the Hellenders.
 West Point, New York – The location of the United States Military Academy, where Kate Kane, Sophie Moore, and later Bette Kane were enrolled as cadets.

Cities that exist exclusively in other DC media
 Capitol City – A major city near Shusterville, and the location of the office of the Bureau for Extra-Normal Matters, where Clark Kent and Lana Lang are interns. Located in Florida. (Superboy)
 Dairyland – The lushest, greenest farmland in America. Located in the Heartland. (Super Friends - Season 1, Episode 7)
 Edge City – The metropolitan area mentioned in various episodes of Smallville, including "Stray", "Ryan", "Power", "Doomsday", "Escape",  "Prodigal", and "Sneeze".
 Freeland – The hometown to Black Lightning in the TV series of the same name. Located in Georgia.
 Granville – The small Kansas town mentioned and seen in various episodes of Smallville, including "Skinwalker" and "Lexmas".
 Jump City – The hometown of the Teen Titans in the animated TV series of the same name and Teen Titans Go! Located on the West Coast.
 Londinium – A fictionalized version of London, England. (Batman - Season 3, Episodes 105–107). 
 Steel City – The hometown of the Titans East in the Teen Titans series. Located on the East Coast.
 Seaboard City – An illusory metropolis on the American East Coast in an alternate Earth in an alternate dimension. Everyday life resembled a late Golden Age to early Silver Age "four-color" superhero comic book, in which the heroes (the Justice Guild of America) constantly fight the villains (the Injustice Guild of America). Green Lantern remembers reading the old comics it was based on as a child. The events on the alternate Earth (similar to DC's Earth-Two) apparently sent out inter-dimensional psychic vibrations. The vibrations then "inspired" the psychically sensitive artists and writers to create the Justice Guild of America comic book in the Justice League's own dimension (presumed to be DC's Earth-One). (Justice League – Season 1, Episodes 16–17)
 Shusterville – A small college town where Clark Kent and T.J. White attend the Siegel School of Journalism at Shuster University. Located in Florida. (Superboy) 
 Tempest Key – The home of Arthur Curry in the unaired CW pilot Aquaman. Located near the Bermuda Triangle, presumably in Florida.

Fictional geographic locations and countries of the DC Universe Earth

 Abyssia – An underground nation once infested by vampires, saved by the Outsiders.
 Atlantis – The legendary sunken continent. Ruled by Aquaman.
 Poseidonis – A major Atlantean city.
 Tritonis – An Atlantean city populated by mer-people. Home of Lori Lemaris.
 Thierna Na Oge – The city of the Tuatha De Danann, a culture that has a great affinity for magic.
 Badhnisia – A small South Seas island nation, in or near present-day Indonesia, where Johnny Thunder was raised.
 Bana-Mighdall – A fictional Amazon nation located in the Middle East. Birthplace of Artemis.
 Bialya – A fictional Middle Eastern country and former refuge of supervillains, once ruled by the Queen Bee. Its population was nearly wiped out by Black Adam during 52.
 Bhutran – A fictional isolated land in southern Asia surrounded by mountains. First appeared in Superman (vol. 2) #97 (February 1995).
 Blackhawk Island – The former home base of the Blackhawks.
 Bulgravia – A fictional Balkan country. Setting for the first mission of the Human Defense Corps.
 Corto Maltese – A war-torn island featured in The Dark Knight Returns, Batman (1989), Smallville, Arrow, The Suicide Squad and Supergirl. Named after a popular comic book character.
 Dinosaur Island – An uncharted Pacific island inhabited by dinosaurs that survived beyond the end of the Cretaceous Period in the Mesozoic Era. The setting for "The War That Time Forgot" stories.
 Galonia – One of several minor European nations controlled by the Earth-Two Lex Luthor.
 Gotham Bay – A river which runs through Gotham City. Speculated to be the Delaware Bay region in geography.
 Hasaragua – A fictional South American country. Home of Brutale.
 Kahndaq – A fictional Middle Eastern country, home of, and formerly ruled by, Black Adam.  It is generally pictured as occupying part of the Sinai Peninsula, the Asian portion of Egypt.
 Kasnia – A fictional war torn Balkan country, sometimes spelled Kaznia (DC animated universe). In the CW Arrowverse, it is known as the Kasnia Conglomerate and is ruled by Per Degaton's family. Referred to in films Batman: Mystery of the Batwoman, and Deathstroke: Knights & Dragons: The Movie.
 Kor – The fictional African kingdom of Doctor Mist.
 Markovia – The home of Terra and Geo-Force. Referred to in Arrow, Black Lightning and Young Justice: Outsiders.
 Molinia – A fictional Latin American country.  First appears in "A Job for Superhombre," Superman #53 (August 1948).
 Modora – The home of Sonar.
 Pokolistan – A nation which now occupies the site of the former Modora. Once ruled by General Zod.
 Nairomi – A fictional African country originally referenced in Batman #79. Appears in Batman v Superman: Dawn of Justice.
 Nyasir – A fictional Eastern-African country; has strong 'Redemption' religious movement. Capital city: Buranda.
 Oolong Island – A fictional location in the DC Universe and the home base of Chang Tzu and occasionally the Doom Patrol.
 the Quirian Emirates – A fictional country briefly mentioned in the Batman: The Animated Series episode "The Cape and Cowl Conspiracy", which Josiah Wormwood had a connection with (DC animated universe).
 Qurac – A fictional Middle Eastern country. It is located on the west side of the Persian Gulf on the Arabian Peninsula. 
 Rhapastan – A fictional Middle Eastern country said to border Turkey.  Plastic Man and Aquaman attempt to broker a ceasefire there during the "Tower of Babel" storyline.
 Rheelasia – A fictional Asian country. First appeared in Birds of Prey #1 (January 1999).
 San Monté – A fictional Latin American country. First appeared in "War in San Monté," Action Comics #2 (July 1938).
 San Sebor – It was overthrown by the corporate-sponsored Conglomerate.
 Santa Prisca – A Caribbean island, homeland of Bane.
 Superbia – A mobile city-state which initially floated above the radioactive ruins of Montevideo, Uruguay.
 Starfish Island – The island where billionaire Oliver Queen was stranded before becoming the Green Arrow. In the Arrowverse, it is known as Lian Yu and the island is located in the North China Sea.
 Syraq – A fictional Middle Eastern country.
 Themyscira – Also known as Paradise Island; the home of Wonder Woman and the Amazons.
 Toran – One of several minor European nations controlled by the Earth-Two Lex Luthor.
 Tropidor – A fictional Central American country.
 Tundi – A fictional West African country. After the defeat of their ruler Lord Battle at the hands of David Zavimbe, the U.N. seized control to steer it toward democracy.
 Umec – A fictional Middle Eastern country. Its name is an acronym created by Greg Rucka and is short for "unnamed Middle Eastern country".
 Vlatava – The homeland of Count Vertigo, destroyed by the Spectre.
 Zandia – The homeland of Brother Blood.
 Zambesi – The fictional African country of Vixen.

Planetary systems
 -7Pi - The homeworld in Green Lantern Sector.
 1417.196.E - A planet destroyed by Star 196.
 Almerac - The former homeworld of Maxima, Ultraa, and Mongal; speculated to be near the Pisces constellation and Andromeda in Capricorn.
 Angor - The homeworld of the Champions of Angor, or the Justifiers (destroyed).
 Apiaton - The homeworld of the Insectoids. Insectoids usually imply near Scorpius.
 Appellax - The homeworld of the Appellaxians, the original foes of the Justice League.
 Aoran - The homeworld of Evil Star, with the entire population killed.
 Archos - A primitive planet.
 Arden - An agricultural community of Green Lantern Monak.
 Astonia - The dying homeworld of Blue Lantern Saint Walker.
 Avalon - The homeworld of DC Comics' King Arthur.
 Bellatrix - The homeworld of Green Lantern Boodikka.
 Beltair IV - The homeworld of the Aquoids.
 the Bizarro World - The homeworld of Bizarro, also called Htrae (Earth spelled backwards; Pre-Crisis only).
 Biot - The Manhunter manufacturing facility and planet.
 Bolovax Vik - The former homeworld of Kilowog; now called Bolovax Vik II, near the Great Bear constellation.
 Bryak - A planet ruled by Brainiac.
 Calaton - A homeworld monarchy ravaged 250,000 years ago by Doomsday.
 Cairn - A planet formerly controlled by a family of intergalactic drug dealers. Later freed by, and made the headquarters of, L.E.G.I.O.N.
 the Chthalonia System 
 Colu - A planet of sentient computers. The homeworld of Brainiac, Vril Dox, Licensed Extra Governmental Interstellar Operatives Network and Brainiac 5.
 Criq - The homeworld of Green Lantern Driq.
 Czarnia - The homeworld of Lobo (destroyed). Possibly located near the Great Bear constellation.
 the Daffath System - The star system of Sinestro Corps member Bedovian.
 Daxam - The homeworld of the Daxamites; hypothetically located in Sagittarius. The homeworld of Mon-El.
 Debstam IV - A planet conquered by Mongul.
 Dhor - The homeworld of Kanjar Ro.
 Exxor - The homeworld of Zan and Jayna the Wonder Twins.
 F'py - The homeworld of Green Lantern Gk'd, of Sector 1337.
 G'newt - A planet of humanoid dogs. The homeworld of Green Lantern G'nort.
 Gallo - A tiny satellite at the edge of the galaxy near Oa. The homeworld of the mysterious Tribune.
 Gaolus - A maximum security prison planet.
 Galtea - The homeworld of Sarkus the Infinite.
 Garon - The homeworld of the Headmen.
 Glazzon - The homeworld of Green Lantern Ahtier.
 Graxos IV - The homeworld of Green Lantern Arisia in the Gemini constellation.
 Graxos V - A planet with a harsh judicial system. The homeworld of Green Lantern Blish Rrab.
 Grenda - A planet of sentient robots. The homeworld of Green Lanterns Stel and Yron.
 H'lven - The homeworld of Green Lanterns Ch'p (deceased) and B'dg.
 Harmony - The homeworld of the now-deceased Goldstar.
 Hwagaagaa - A planet seized by Tebans.
 Ith'kaa - The base of operations for Captain Comet and the location of Comet City.
 Inner Tasnia - The homeworld of Green Lantern Flodo Span.
 Planet J586 - A planet of intelligent plants. The homeworld of Green Lantern Medphyll.  
 Karna - The homeworld of the Gordanians.
 Kalanor - A planet possibly located in the Taurus constellation. The homeworld of Despero.
 Korugar - The homeworld of Sinestro, Katma Tui, and Soranik Natu of the Green Lantern Corps.
 Khondra - The location of the secret military laboratory that created the sentient virus and Sinestro Corps member Despotellis.
 Khundia - The homeworld of the Khunds; speculated to be near the Great Bear constellation.
 Kreno - A planet where cyborgs are engineered.  The homeworld of the cyborg mercenary B'aad.
 Krolotea - The homeworld of the Krolotean Gremlins.
 Krypton - The homeworld of Superman and Supergirl (destroyed). Formerly located near Pisces in the Andromeda Galaxy, speculated to be pointed north towards Libra in some modern versions. Krypton orbited the red giant Rao within the Pleiades in Post-Modern Age comics. Locations on Krypton include:
 M'brai - A planet with a unique evolutionary system.
 Maag - The homeworld of the Green Lantern Volk of Maag.
 Maltus - The original homeworld of the Guardians of the Universe, the Zamarons and the Controllers; hypothetically located near the Pleiades.
 Mogo - A sentient planet who is also a member of the Green Lantern Corps.
 Muscaria - A planet of sentient fungi. The homeworld of Green Lantern Amanita.
 Myrg - A planet ruled by Princess Ramia and her Terran consort/husband Doiby Dickles.
 Naftali - A planet that the Martian Manhunter visited to meet an ancient holy man named K'rkzar (New Earth); the planet's location is officially located in MACS0647-JD accepted and confirmed by Paul Kupperberg himself on Twitter giving the honours to the individual who asked, which is equivalent to 13.26 billion light-years from Earth.
 Oa - The homeworld of the Guardians of the Universe, speculated to be near the center of the Milky Way Galaxy.
 the Mosaic World - A chaotic place on Oa where Appa Ali Apsa transported various cities from different galaxies.
 Odym - A Paradise-like planet, location of the Blue Lantern Corps Power Battery.
 the Obsidian Deeps - A Green Lantern Sector in deep space.
 Orinda - A secret base of operations for the Manhunters.
 Ovacron Six - The homeworld of Green Lantern Hannu.  Its inhabitants disdain the use of any weapons and rely on their own brute strength.
 Pandina - The homeworld of Star Sapphire Remoni-Notra.
 the Puppet Planetoid – A planet in the DC Universe in the 30th century. According to legend, a race of giants created playthings on this world long ago. It is now mostly uninhabited. A number of notable events took place here for the Legion of Super-Heroes. When under attack from Satan Girl, Supergirl hid the Legion here. Ultra Boy once saved Sun Boy's life here, though this occurred in a backstory. Former Legionnaire Blok eventually found his way to this world and lived in seclusion for many years, until tracked down by the space pirate Roxxas, who used advanced Dominator weapons to kill him as a kind of "demonstration" for the Dominators of his abilities.
 Qualar IV - A planet of humanoid chicken-like aliens. The homeworld of Green Lantern Perdoo. 
 Rann - The adopted homeworld of Adam Strange located in the Polara star system.
 Ramnos - A homeworld devastated by the Traitor.
 the Rexulus System - A star system of Sinestro Corps member Setag Retss.
 Rimbor - The homeworld of Ultra Boy and Timber Wolf.
 Rojira - The homeworld of the Ruulan Green Lanterns.
 Ryut - A dead planet and location of the Black Lantern Corps Power Battery.
 Scylla - A space of the Triarch.
 Slyggia - The homeworld of Green Lantern Salaak.
 the Solar System
 Venus - The former homeworld of Mister Mind.
 Earth
 the Moon - The location of the Justice League Watchtower and the former homeworld of Eclipso.
 Mars - The former homeworld of the Martian Manhunter, his fellow Green Martians, and the White Martians.
 Saturn - It is orbited by the lunar homeworlds of the Faceless Hunter, Jemm, Son of Saturn, and the Red and White Saturnian races.
 Kalamar - A subatomic lunar world.
 the Sun - The native white-yellow star and the source of Kryptonian superpowers on Earth.
 Southern Goldstar - The homeworld of Green Lantern Olapet.
 Sputa - The bacterial homeworld of the Green Lantern Larvox.
 Takron-Galtos - A prison planet seen in the Justice League of America and Legion of Super-Heroes comic books.
 Talok III - The homeworld of former Starman Mikaal Tomas.
 Talok IV - The homeworld of Sinestro Corps member Lyssa Drak.
 Talok VIII - The homeworld of Legion of Super-Heroes member Shadow Lass.
 Tanjent - The homeworld to psionic children.
 Tchk-Tchk - The homeworld of the Tchkii Legion.
 Thanotopsia - The homeworld destroyed by Lobo using nuclear weapons.
 Thanagar - The former homeworld of the Thanagarian race, Hawkman (Katar Hol) and Hawkwoman, located in the Polara star system; destroyed during the "Infinite Crisis" when Superboy-Prime pushed Rann close to its orbit.
 Thar - A living star once worshipped by aliens.
 Zintha - An icy planet that orbits Thar.
 Thordia - A planet located near Cetus. The homeworld to Darkstar's enemy Pay-Back.  
 Thoron - A planet in the same solar system as Krypton. Its inhabitants gain superpowers under a yellow sun, but are not as strong as Kryptonians. The homeworld of Halk Kar.
 Throneworld - The capital of a galactic empire. Ruled by former Starman Prince Gavyn.
 Thronn - The homeworld of the Thronnians and the Honor Team of Thronn.
 Transilvane - An artificial planet created by NASA to simulate extraterrestrial environments. Notable for having two large horn-like protuberances.
 Trigus VIII - The homeworld of the Femazons.
 Tristram - The homeworld of Green Lantern M'Dahna of Sector 2751.
 Trogk - The homeworld of Sinestro Corps member Moose of Trogk.
 Tront - The homeworld of Green Lantern Eddore.
 Ungara - The homeworld of Green Lantern Abin Sur.
 The Vegan star system - A neighboring star system of 25 planets which are the homeworlds of many races, including the Omega Men.
 the Citadel Homeworld
 Karna - The homeworld of the Gordanians.
 Hnyxx
 Okaara - The homeworld of the Warlords of Okaara. Location of the Orange Light, where Larfleeze held the power of Avarice.
 Ogyptu - The homeworld of an interplanetary giant race. 
 Tamaran - The homeworld of Starfire and her evil sister Blackfire.
 the Prison Planet
 Slagg
 Uxor
 Wombworld 
 Ventura - The "gamblers' planet". The homeworld of the villainous Rokk and Sorban.
 Vivarium - An artificial planet of the Ayries.
 Vulcan - The homeworld of Green Lantern Saarek.
 Warworld - An artificial planet created by the Warzoons that is ruled by Mongul, his son and Mongal.
 Xanshi - A planet of bird-like beings. Green Lantern John Stewart was blamed for its destruction. The homeworld of the villain Fatality.
 Xarda
 Xudar - The homeworld of Green Lantern Tomar Re.
 Ydoc - A gladiatorial planet. The homeworld of Green Lantern Vandor.
 Ysmault - The Guardians-sealed homeworld of the Empire of Tears and the location of the Red Lantern Corps Power Battery.
 Zakkaria - The homeworld of the Crimson Star Mob.
 Zamaron - The homeworld of the Zamarons and the Violet Lantern Corps. Speculated to be near Sirius. Feminine intelligent Nordic or reptilian species can range anywhere to Virgo-Libra North and from Cetus, in the vicinity of Aquarius.
 Zebron - A planet of plant-like people threatened by the Ravagers from Olys.

Planets and moons which exist during the era of the Legion of Super-Heroes
Besides the planets listed above, the following planets exist during the era of the L.S.H.

 Aarok - A planet colonized by Earth natives in the future. The homeworld of XS.
 Aleph - The homeworld of Kinetix; formerly populated by a magical civilization.
 Angtu - The poisonous homeworld of the villainous Mano, who "single-handedly" destroyed his own planet.
 Baaldur - The homeworld of Glorith.
 Bgztl - The homeworld of Phantom Girl, where the natives have the power of intangibility.
 Bismoll - The homeworld of Tenzil Kem (also known as Matter-Eater Lad). The people of Bismoll have the ability to eat and digest all forms of matter.
 Braal - The homeworld of Cosmic Boy and his younger brother Magnetic Kid. Braalians possess the power of magnetism.
 Cargg - The homeworld of Triplicate Girl/Duo Damsel where the natives have the ability to split into three individuals.
 Dryad - The homeworld of Blok.
 Durla - The homeworld of Chameleon Boy and his race of shapeshifters.
 Hajor - The homeworld of the telekinetic mutant Kid Psycho.
 Hykraius - The homeworld of Tellus.
 Imsk - The homeworld of Shrinking Violet. Imskians are able to shrink to tiny, even microscopic, size at will.
 Kathoon - A perpetually dark planet with no sun. The homeworld of Night Girl.
 the Labyrinth - A prison planet that served as a successor to Takron-Galtos.
 Lallor - The homeworld of Duplicate Boy, Evolvo Lad, Gas Girl, Life Lass, and Beast Boy.
 Lupra - The homeworld of Color Kid.
 Lythyl - A harsh and cruel planet of warriors. The homeworld of the second Karate Kid.
 Mardru - The homeworld of Chlorophyll Kid.
 Myar - The "alchemists' planet" and the homeworld of Nemesis Kid.
 Naltor - The homeworld of Dream Girl. The inhabitants of Naltor possess the power of dream-based precognition.
 Nullport - A planetoid famed for the construction of spacecraft.
 Orando - The medieval homeworld of Princess Projectra (also known as Sensor Girl).
 Phlon - The homeworld of Chemical King.
 Rigel 9 - A very populous planet of one-eyed aliens. A possible Simpsons reference, it was mentioned in the second episode of Justice League by Green Lantern John Stewart. It is said to lie in Sector 2814.
 Shanghalla - A planetoid that serves as a burial place for the galaxy's greatest superheroes.
 Shwar - The homeworld of Fire Lad.
 Somahtur - The homeworld of Infectious Lass.
 Starhaven - A planet colonized by Native Americans. The homeworld of Dawnstar.
 Titan - A moon of Saturn and the homeworld of Imra Ardeen (also known as Saturn Girl), and Saturn Queen. All Titanians possess telepathy.
 Tharr - The homeworld of Polar Boy, a member of a race of humanoids who can generate intense cold at will.
 Toomey VI - The homeworld of Green Lantern Barreer Wot.
 Trom - The homeworld of Element Lad, the last survivor of his planet's element-transmuting race.
 Vonn - A planet invaded by the Tython.
 Vengar - The homeworld of the evil Emerald Empress.
 Weber's World - An artificial planet that serves as the headquarters of the United Planets.
 Winath - A planet where twin births are the norm. The homeworld of the twins Garth Ranzz (also known as Lightning Lad or Live Wire) and Ayla Ranzz (also known as Lightning Lass or Spark) and their brother Mekt Ranzz (also known as Lightning Lord).
 Xanthu - The homeworld of Star Boy and Atmos.
 Zerox - The "sorcerer's world". The homeworld of Mordru and the planet where the White Witch learned the practice of magic.
 Zoon (or "Zuun") - The homeworld of Timber Wolf.
 Zwen - The homeworld of Stone Boy. The inhabitants of Zwen developed the ability to transform themselves into stone.

Extradimensional realms
 the Antimatter Universe of Qward
 the Antimatter Earth - The homeworld of the Crime Syndicate of America.
 Azarath - The homeworld of Raven.
 Barter's Shop - The mysterious shop owned by the Hawk and the Dove's foe Barter; it is a dimensional nexus.
 the Bleed - A void between dimensions of the Multiverse.
 Darkworld - The birthplace of the Atlantean gods.
 the Deadlands - The home of demons fought by Fate.
 Destiny's Garden of Forking Ways - An endless labyrinth of possible histories.
 the Dreaming - The realm of the sleeping mind. Ruled by Dream of the Endless a.k.a. the Sandman.
 the Dream Realm - A realm where telepaths such as the Key reside.
 Earth D - The home of the Justice Alliance of America, as seen in Legends of the DC Universe: Crisis on Infinite Earths (February 1999).
 Emerald Space - The dimensional space for the Green Lanterns who died in action, as seen in Hal Jordan and the Green Lantern Corps #9 (March 2017).
 Faerie - A mystical realm of the legendary Fair Folk. Ruled by Auberon and Titania.
 the Fifth Dimension - An interdimensional reality that exists outside the normal space-time continuum.
 Zrrrf - The homeland of Mister Mxyzptlk, Bat-Mite, Qwsp, and the Thunderbolt.
 the Fourth World - A dimension that exists between Hell and the Universe. Although it is not considered a universe in itself, it contains several worlds; those being the most important are Apokolips and New Genesis. The only means of transportation from this dimension to the Multiverse is the Boom Tube.
 Apokolips - The homeworld of the New Gods of Apokolips, who are led by Darkseid.
 the God Wave - An interstellar phenomenon from the previous universe.
 New Genesis - The homeworld of the New Gods of New Genesis, who are led by Highfather.
 the Promethean Galaxy - The location of the Source.
 the Source Wall - The supposed edge of reality itself.
 Gemworld - A mystical realm ruled by gem-based royal houses.
 the Ghost Zone - A dimension which Prometheus uses to teleport interdimensionally. Wizard also possesses a Key to the Ghost Zone.
 the Green Realm - A dimension where the victims of Power Ring's weapon, the Ring of Volthoom, go after they succumb to death from its parasitic power.
 Heaven - An afterworld of the blessed.
 Hell - An abode of the demons and afterworld of the damned.
 Hypertime - The interconnected web of divergent timelines.
 Ifé - The other dimensional homeland of the African gods known as the Orishas, visited by the Spectre when he is searching for God.
 the Jejune Realm - A land of comical lesser gods from Vext.
 the Land of the Nightshades - A realm of shadow-manipulators. Birthworld of Nightshade.
 the Land of the Unliving - The home dimension of the cosmic being known as Nekron, Lord of the Unliving.
 Limbo - The void between realities. Former prison of the Justice Society of America.
 the Magiclands - The Magiclands are seven different realms where magic reigns supreme and can only be accessed by a train station in the Rock of Eternity.
 the Darklands - A place where the soul goes upon their death. It is also filled with vampires, mummies, pumpkin monsters, and other spooky creatures.
 the Earthlands - See Earth above.
 the Funlands - A place that is made up of one big amusement park and is ruled by King Kid. Due to his hatred for adults, any kid who turns 18 will be placed in slavery to help maintain the Funlands.
 the Gamelands - A dimension that is based around the video game concept. It requires 1,000,000 points to access the CPU needed to leave the Gamelands.
 the Monsterlands - A dimension where the Monster Society of Evil are imprisoned in its Dungeon of Eternity. Each of its inmates are gathered throughout the Magiclands, including some from the Earthlands. Superboy-Prime was also shown to be imprisoned here. Mister Mind stated to Doctor Sivana that the Monsterlands used to be called the Gods' Realm until the day of Black Adam's betrayal, which led them to strip the gods of their powers and close the doors to the Magiclands.
 the Wildlands - A dimension populated by anthropomorphic animals and where their humans are extinct. The tiger community is kept in a zoo because one tiger helped the humans during a war between the humans and the animals.
 the Wozenderlands - A dimension that is a hybrid of the Land of Oz and Wonderland. It is inhabited by characters from fictional children's novels like the Cheshire Cat, the Scarecrow, the Tin Man, the White Rabbit, the winged monkeys, the talking trees, and the Wicked Witches of the North, South, East, and West. According to the Scarecrow, Dorothy Gale and Alice united the Land of Oz and Wonderland to save them from the threat of the Monsterlands.
 the Meta-Zone - The homeworld of Shade the Changing Man.
 the Mirror World - The Fourth Dimension. Home of the Duomalians and the Orinocas. Originally discovered by Zatara, later rediscovered by the Mirror Master.
 Mount Olympus - The home of the Greco-Roman gods.
 the Multiverse - Formerly infinite, now a series of 52 alternate Earths.
 Myrra - A realm of sword and sorcery. Former home of Nightmaster.
 the Oblivion Bar - An extra-dimensional bar that only magically talented persons can access. Headquarters of the Shadowpact.
 the Omega Realm - An extra-dimensional realm where Darkseid can send a victim who is hit by his Omega Effect.
 the Paradise Dimension - A dimension where Superman-Prime gains his powers.
 the Pax Dimension - A dimension where the Bloodline Parasites come from.
 the Phantom Zone - A prison realm created by the Kryptonians to send Kryptonian criminals.
 the pocket universe created by the Time Trapper.
 Purgatory - An afterworld where souls atone for their crimes.
 Pytharia - An Earth-like realm resembling prehistoric history.
 the Rock of Eternity - The home of the wizard Shazam, located at the center of space and time.
 Savoth - A planet that is the homeworld of the Savothians, a race of camel-like aliens who hold a longstanding friendship with the Flash family. The planet is located in another dimension from Earth, which can only be accessed by the Speed Force.
 the Shadowlands - A place of primordial darkness. It is the power source for Obsidian and the Shade, among others.
 the Silver City - The abode of the angels and afterworld of the blessed.
 the Sixth Dimension - It serves as the "Multiverse Control Room" which is at the top of the Multiverse scale. The Super Celestial Perpetua created her children the Monitor, the Anti-Monitor, and the World Forger here and either one can regenerate here if they are destroyed.
 Skartaris - A savage magical dimension "within" the Earth. Current home of Travis Morgan, the Warlord.
 the Speed Force - A dimension which all speedsters tap into.
 The Tantu Totem worn by Vixen contains the extradimensional home of the African god Anansi.
 Teall - An alternate dimension home to microscopic energy beings. Quislet of the Legion of Super-Heroes is a Teallian.
 the Timestream - A dimension where time is expressed spatially. Home of the Timepoint; also called Vanishing Point, headquarters of the Linear Men.
 Timepoint - A prison outside of time.
 Wintersgate Manor - A dimensional nexus and the home of Baron Winters, leader of the Night Force.
 Xarapion - The homeworld of Thar Dan, the inventor of the Dimensiometer belt given to the Shadow Thief.

See also
List of DC Comics characters
List of DC Comics teams and organizations
List of alien races in DC Comics
List of criminal organizations in DC Comics
List of fictional towns in comics
List of government agencies in DC Comics
Features of the Marvel Universe

References

 
 Locations
 Locations
 Locations
DC Locations